The 2022 Mississippi State Bulldogs football team represented Mississippi State University in the 2022 NCAA Division I FBS football season. The Bulldogs played their home games at Davis Wade Stadium in Starkville, Mississippi, and compete in the Western Division of the Southeastern Conference (SEC). They were led by third-year head coach Mike Leach through the regular season, with Zach Arnett taking over for the team’s bowl appearance after Leach's death in December 2022.

In October 2022, 19-year-old freshman offensive lineman Samuel Westmoreland, from Tupelo, Mississippi, was found dead; foul play is not currently suspected. The Oktibbeha County Sheriff's Office and Coroner's Office, and MSU Athletics and Student Affairs, are conducting investigations into what may have led to his death, and until they are concluded, no further information regarding his cause of death will be released.

On December 11, 2022, Leach was hospitalized in critical condition, which resulted in Zach Arnett being elevated to interim head coach of the football program. Practice for the Bulldogs ahead of the 2023 ReliaQuest Bowl and recruiting, was scheduled to continue as normal. Leach died in the evening on December 12, 2022, with Mississippi State announcing the news in a statement the following morning. Following the death of Coach Leach, Zach Arnett was made the permanent head coach.

Schedule
Mississippi State and the SEC announced the 2022 football schedule on September 21, 2021.

Rankings

Coaching staff

References

Mississippi State
Mississippi State Bulldogs football seasons
ReliaQuest Bowl champion seasons
Mississippi State Bulldogs football